Suryadevara is an Indian surname.

 Suryadevara Ramachandra Rao Padma Shri Award recipient in 1998.
 Dhivya Suryadevara First female chief financial officer of General Motors

Indian surnames